Father Anthony Murmu was an Indian politician. He was elected to the Lok Sabha      from Rajmahal, Bihar as a member of the Janata Party. Murmu was a Jesuit priest. He struggled for rights of Santhal tribals.

Murmu was killed in a massacre in Banjhi 19 April 1985 along with 14 other Santhals.

References

External links
Official biographical sketch in Parliament of India website

Janata Party politicians
Santali people
India MPs 1977–1979
1930 births
Lok Sabha members from Bihar
1985 deaths